Southwest Airlines Flight 3472 was a regularly scheduled passenger flight operating from New Orleans International Airport in New Orleans, Louisiana to Orlando International Airport in Orlando, Florida. On August 27, 2016, the Boeing 737-7H4, with 99 passengers and five crew, 12 minutes after departure from New Orleans, was climbing through 31,000 feet and heading east over the Gulf of Mexico when the aircraft's number one CFM International CFM56-7 engine suffered an engine failure. A fan blade in the engine broke due to a fatigue crack. The separated portion of the blade rotated within the engine, moving forward, striking the engine inlet. Debris from the damaged engine inlet punctured the left side of the fuselage causing a loss of cabin pressure and damaged the wing and empennage. Oxygen masks were deployed to passengers while the crew initiated an emergency descent to 10,000 feet. The aircraft then diverted to Pensacola International Airport for a safe landing about 20 minutes later without further incident. While the aircraft sustained substantial damage, there were no injuries.

The final accident report found that "The fan case had no through-hole penetrations and showed no evidence of an uncontainment." The studies made for the investigation looked at the path of the fan blade that broke and estimated that the fragments were ejected from the front of the engine at an angle consistent with the FBO (fan blade out) testing carried out when the engine was certified. The level of damage to the engine inlet was, however, greater than expected in the accident when compared with the certification test.

Aircraft 
The aircraft involved was a 16-year-old Boeing 737-7H4 (registration number N766SW), delivered to Southwest in May 2000. The jet was subsequently returned to service and later retired by Southwest in November 2019 to Greenwood–Leflore Airport, Mississippi. The aircraft was later scrapped in 2020.

Investigation 
The accident was investigated by the Federal Aviation Administration and the National Transportation Safety Board (NTSB). On September 12, 2016, the NTSB reported their initial findings.

Initial findings from the examination of the airplane include:

 The left engine inlet separated from the engine during the flight. Debris from the engine inlet damaged the airplane fuselage, wing and empennage.
 A 5-inch by 16-inch hole was found in the left fuselage just above the left wing.
 No fan blade or inlet material was found in the hole and the passenger interior compartment was not penetrated.
 During the accident sequence, the airplane experienced a cabin de-pressurization.
 The aircraft maintenance records are being reviewed.

Initial findings from the engine examination include:

 One fan blade separated from the fan disk during the accident flight.
 The root of the separated fan blade remained in the fan hub; however, the remainder of the blade was not recovered.

Initial findings from the metallurgical examination conducted in the NTSB Materials Laboratory include:

 The fracture surface of the missing blade showed curving crack arrest lines consistent with fatigue crack growth. The fatigue crack region was 29 mm (1.14″) long and 5.5 mm (0.217″) deep.
 The center of the fatigue origin area was about 53 mm (2.1″) aft of the forward face of the blade root. No surface or material anomalies were noted during an examination of the fatigue crack origin using scanning electron microscopy and energy-dispersive x-ray spectroscopy.
 The blades are manufactured of a titanium alloy and the root contact face is coated with a copper-nickel-indium alloy.

Future investigative work by the NTSB will include 3-D measurements of the contact areas of all the blades, a non-destructive examination of the blade surfaces for cracks, and a review of the engine maintenance records.

Parties to the investigation include the Federal Aviation Administration, Southwest Airlines, the Southwest Airlines Pilots Association, and CFM International, which is a joint venture between GE Aviation (US) and Safran Aircraft Engines (France). The French Bureau of Investigation and Analysis for Civil Aviation Safety has also appointed an accredited representative who is supported by a technical advisor from Safran Aircraft Engines.

On March 30, 2020, the NTSB determined the probable cause of the accident as follows: "A low-cycle fatigue crack in the dovetail of fan blade No. 23, which resulted in the fan blade separating in flight and impacting the fan case. This impact caused the fan blade to fracture into fragments that traveled farther than expected into the inlet, which compromised the structural integrity of the inlet and led to the in-flight separation of inlet components. A portion of the inlet struck the fuselage and created a hole, causing the cabin to depressurize."

See also 
 Southwest Airlines Flight 1380, a 2018 accident involving the same airline with an engine failure with a similar aircraft and engine causing one fatality.

Notes

References 

Accidents and incidents involving the Boeing 737 Next Generation
August 2016 events in the United States
Aviation accidents and incidents in the United States in 2016
Southwest Airlines accidents and incidents
Airliner accidents and incidents caused by engine failure
Airliner accidents and incidents involving uncontained engine failure